Campbell Cemetery is a historic cemetery in rural southwestern Randolph County, Arkansas, southeast of Imboden near the Spring River.  It is a small family cemetery, and is notable primarily for one of its earliest burials, that of James Campbell (b. 1780).  Campbell was the first judge and county sheriff of Lawrence County, the second county established in what is now the state of Arkansas, and was an early settler of Randolph County.

The cemetery was listed on the National Register of Historic Places in 2005.

See also
National Register of Historic Places listings in Randolph County, Arkansas

References

External links
 

Cemeteries on the National Register of Historic Places in Arkansas
1835 establishments in Arkansas Territory
Buildings and structures in Randolph County, Arkansas
National Register of Historic Places in Randolph County, Arkansas
Cemeteries established in the 1830s